The baal teshuva movement is a description of the return of secular Jews to religious Judaism. The term baal teshuva is from the Talmud, literally meaning "master of repentance". The term is used to refer to a worldwide phenomenon among the Jewish people.

It began during the mid-twentieth century, when large numbers of previously highly assimilated Jews chose to move in the direction of practicing Judaism. The spiritual and religious journey of those involved has brought them to become involved with all the Jewish denominations, the most far-reaching stage being when they choose to follow Orthodox Judaism and its branches such as Haredi Judaism and Hasidic Judaism. This movement has continued unabated until the present time and has been noted by scholars who have written articles and books about its significance to modern Jewish history.

This movement among the Jewish people has produced a corresponding response from the various Jewish denominations and rabbis, particularly from Orthodox Judaism, which calls its response kiruv or kiruv rechokim ("bringing close/er [the] distant [ones]") or keruv. The terms "baal teshuva" (Hebrew: בעל תשובה) and kiruv are often linked together when discussing both the return of Jews to traditional Religious Judaism through the outreach efforts and the response to it.

In 1986, New York magazine reported:

Origins

In the United States
Appearing as an identifiable movement in the 1960s, a growing number of young Jews who had previously been raised in non-religious homes in the United States started to develop a strong interest in becoming a part of observant Judaism; many of these people, in contrast to sociological expectations, became attracted to observant Judaism within Orthodoxy.

Rabbi Yosef Blau the mashgiach ruchani of Yeshiva University has noted:

The Baal teshuva movement has not just been about Orthodox Jewish outreach alone as it is a far wider phenomenon that has been noted, researched and written about by sociologists, historians and Jewish thinkers since the 1960s when it came into the fore. The Baal teshuva movement, in its origins, was as much inspired by the sixties and seventies counterculture, especially the counterculture of the 1960s and the Hippie movement (Rabbi Shlomo Carlebach tried to channel the counterculture and its music into a Jewish direction through his music and teachings), the Woodstock Festival, the drug subculture, the new interest in Eastern religions (Rabbi Aryeh Kaplan tried to channel that interest into a Jewish direction through his writings) and the spirit of youth rebellion that pervades US high schools and college campuses. It was in recognition of this phenomenon and in response to it that the earliest emissaries of the Lubavitcher Rebbe, Rabbi Menachem Mendel Schneerson went out to connect with these people and "recruit" them to Judaism.

Whereas the earliest Baal teshuva trends were partly related to the prevailing anti-establishment atmosphere of the 1960s it was an outcome of the great rise in Jewish pride in the wake of Israel's victory in 1967's Six-Day War: "It can even be said the inspiration rising from the Six-Day War fueled the beginnings of the baal teshuva movement."
The research of Janet Aviad also suggests that the oft-claimed “miraculous” Israeli victory in 1967 gave momentum to the Ba’al Teshuva movement.

Although the effects of the Holocaust and the sway of the counterculture movement led many to abandon their religious upbringing, others were willing to experiment with alternate liberated lifestyles, and as part of this experimentation it was intriguing to them to explore Jewish Sabbath observance, intensive prayer, and deeper Torah and Talmud study. Many of these people adopted a fully Orthodox Jewish way of life, and although some eventually dropped out entirely or found their path within Conservative Judaism or other streams of Judaism, or even joined other faiths, others chose to remain with Orthodoxy:

In the former Soviet Union

The baal teshuva movement also appeared in the former Soviet Union, which at that time had almost completely secularized its Jewish population. The rise of Jewish pride came in response to the growth of the State of Israel, in reaction to the USSR's pro-Arab and anti-Zionist policies, and in reaction to USSR's antisemitism.

The Israeli victory in the Six-Day War in 1967 ignited the pride of Jews in the Soviet Union, particularly in Russia. Suddenly there were hundreds of thousands of Jews wanting to go to Israel, although they dared not express their desire too openly. Several thousand applied for exit visas to Israel and were instantly ostracized by government organizations including the KGB. Many hundreds became refuseniks (otkazniks in Russian), willing to suffer jail time to demonstrate their new-found longing for Zion. In the middle of this, there arose a new interest in learning about and practicing Judaism, an urge that the Communist government had long attempted to stamp out.

Many Russian Jews began to study any Jewish texts they could lay their hands on. Foreign rabbis, often young students in Chabad Yeshivos, came on visits in order to teach how to learn Torah and how to observe Jewish law. Jewish ritual objects, such as tefillin, mezuzot, siddurim, and even matzah, were also smuggled into Russia. With the fall of the Communist regime, there is now a rich resource of Russian religious texts that flourishes and caters to Russian Jews living in Russia, America, and Israel.

The return-to-Judaism movement was a spontaneous grassroots movement from the ground up and was part of the refusenik movement; it came as a great surprise to the Soviet authorities, and even to the Jewish community outside the USSR and it eventually contributed to Aliyah from the Soviet Union and post-Soviet states and the collapse of the Soviet Union and emigration to Israel. Young leaders included Yosef Mendelevich, Eliyahu Essas (who eventually became a rabbi), Herman Branover, and Yitzchok Kogan, who all later moved to Israel and are now actively teaching other Russian emigres in Israel, aside from Kogan, who leads a community in Moscow.

In Israel

During the 1960s there was a movement among secular Israeli Jews that was essentially a search for spirituality. At the time, most Israeli parents were secular Zionists. While some Jews were hostile to traditional Judaism, a spiritual quest in the 1960s and 1970s caused some Israelis to seek answers in Jewish tradition.

Rabbi Aharon Feldman observes that:

In Israel, special schools developed for the newly-religious, who came to be called "Baalei teshuva" (m. plural), "Baal teshuva" (m. singular), a "Baalat teshuva" refers to a female, and "chozeret biteshuva" in Hebrew. Schools were established dedicated to the intensive study of Torah specially designed for the newly religious students who wanted to devote time to intensive study of classical texts with the ancient rabbinic commentaries. These schools opened in the early 1970s, mainly based in Jerusalem. Two significant institutions have been the Aish HaTorah ("fire of Torah") Yeshiva headed by Rabbi Noach Weinberg, and the Ohr Somayach Yeshiva headed by Rabbis Nota Schiller and Mendel Weinbach. Both of these rabbis had degrees from American universities and were able to speak to the modern mind-set.
See also Diaspora Yeshiva, Machon Meir.

Chabad Hasidism, with many Chabad houses throughout Israel, and yeshiva programs for Israelis, Russians, French, and Americans, reach out to thousands. Followers of Chabad can be seen attending tefillin booths at the Western Wall and Ben Gurion International Airport as well as other public places, and distribute Shabbat candles on Fridays. There are also Chabad houses in almost every location that Jews might be located, whether as permanent residents, on business, or tourists.

Among Sephardi and Mizrahi Jews, Rabbi Amnon Yitzhak and Rabbi Reuven Elbaz are considered the leaders of the baal teshuva movement in Israel.

Challenges, critiques and difficulties

As with all social movements, there is controversy and criticism. Early twenty-first century researchers have debated the "drop-out" rate from this movement and the reasons for it and new challenges that are now presented. From a 2005 paper:

See also
Chabad outreach
Orthodox Jewish outreach
Reform Judaism outreach
Conservative Judaism outreach
List of Baalei teshuva
Jewish assimilation
Silent Holocaust
Jewish fundamentalism

References

External links
Baal teshuva movement noted as part of growth of Orthodoxy (World of the Yeshiva by William Helmreich, p.xix)
America's Alternative Religions By Timothy Miller, (academic research about the Baal teshuva movement) p. 113
Photos of BT Yeshivas for Men

Jewish religious movements